ABC Springfield could refer to:
 WGGB-TV (Springfield, Massachusetts)
 WICS (Springfield, Illinois)
 KYTV (TV station) (Springfield, Missouri)